Philharmonia is a genus of moth in the family Lecithoceridae.

Species
Philharmonia adusta Park, 2000
Philharmonia basinigra Wang & Wang, 2015
Philharmonia calypsa Wu, 1994
Philharmonia eurysia Wu, 2000
Philharmonia filiale Gozmány, 2002
Philharmonia insigna Wu & Park, 1999
Philharmonia melona Wu, 1994
Philharmonia paratona Gozmány, 1978
Philharmonia spinula Wu, 2003

References

Torodorinae
 
Moth genera